We All Fall Down is the third studio album by American rapper Prozak. The album was released on September 17, 2013, by Strange Music.  The album has sold 9,000 copies in the United States as of September 2015.

Track listing
All songs produced by Seven.

Charts

References

Prozak (rapper) albums
2013 albums
Albums produced by Seven (record producer)
Strange Music albums